Threefin or triplefin blennies are blenniiforms, small percomorph marine fish of the family Tripterygiidae. Found in tropical and temperate waters of the Atlantic, Pacific and Indian Oceans, the family contains about 150 species in 30 genera. The family name derives from the Greek tripteros meaning "with three wings".

With an elongated, typical blenny form, threefin blennies differ from their relatives by having a dorsal fin separated into three parts (hence the name); the first two are spinous. The small, slender pelvic fins are located underneath the throat and possess a single spine; the large anal fin may have one or two spines. The pectoral fins are greatly enlarged, and the tail fin is rounded. The New Zealand topknot, Notoclinus fenestratus, is the largest species at 20 cm in total length; most other species do not exceed 6 cm.

Many threefin blennies are brightly coloured, often for reasons of camouflage; these species are popular in the aquarium hobby. As demersal fish, threefin blennies spend most of their time on or near the bottom on coral and rocks. The fish are typically found in shallow, clear waters with sun exposure, such as lagoons and seaward reefs; nervous fish, they retreat to rock crevices at any perceived threat.

Threefin blennies are diurnal and territorial; many species exhibit sexual dichromatism, with the females drab compared to the males. The second dorsal fin is also extended in the males of some species. Small invertebrates comprise the bulk of the threefin blenny diet.

Genera
FishBase lists about 150 species in 30 genera:
Subfamily Notoclininae Fricke, 2009
Brachynectes Scott, 1957
Notoclinus Gill, 1893
 Subfamily Tripterygiinae Whitley, 1931
 Acanthanectes Holleman & Buxton, 1993
 Apopterygion Kuiter, 1986
 Axoclinus Fowler, 1944
 Bellapiscis Hardy, 1987
 Blennodon Hardy, 1987
 Ceratobregma Holleman, 1987

 Cremnochorites Holleman, 1982
 Crocodilichthys Allen & Robertson, 1991
 Cryptichthys Hardy, 1987
 Enneanectes D.S. Jordan & Evermann, 1895
 Enneapterygius Rüppell, 1835
 Forsterygion Whitley & Phillipps, 1939
 Gilloblennius Whitley & Phillipps, 1939
 Helcogramma McCulloch & Waite, 1918
 Helcogrammoides Rosenblatt, 1990
 Karalepis Hardy, 1984
 Lepidoblennius Steindachner, 1867
 Lepidonectes Bussing, 1991
 Matanui Jawad & Clements, 2004
 Norfolkia Fowler, 1953
 Notoclinops Whitley, 1930
  
 Ruanoho Hardy, 1986
 Springerichthys Shen, 1994
 Trianectes McCulloch & Waite, 1918
 Trinorfolkia Fricke, 1994
 Tripterygion Risso, 1827
 Ucla Holleman, 1993

References 
 

 
Blenniiformes